The British Association of Dental Nurses (BADN) is an organisation that represents dental nurses across the UK, headquartered in Lancashire, and has previously been a trade union.

History
It was formed in October 1940 in Lancashire. It was originally called the British Dental Nurses and Assistants Society. On 1 November 1994 the name became the British Association of Dental Nurses.

In 1976, due to legislation of the Trade Union and Labour Relations Act 1974, to support dental nurses it had to become a trade union, the Association of British Dental Surgery Assistants.

On 11 May 1999 all dental nurses had to be registered.

Function
On 1 October 1964 it formed a Voluntary National Register of Registered Dental Nurses. There are over 9,000 Registered Dental Nurses in the UK, but this is now overseen by the General Dental Council (GDC) but the register is updated by the BADN, not the GDC. Since 1954 the organization has twice-yearly meetings with the British Dental Association.

Journal
Since the mid-1940s it has produced a journal, the British Dental Surgery Assistant. In 1994 this became British Dental Nurses' Journal (BDNJ).

Structure
The association's offices are situated on the Hillhouse International Business Park, near the Wyre Way (next to the River Wyre), accessed via the A585 and B5268.

See also
 British Dental Journal
 British Orthodontic Society
 National Examining Board for Dental Nurses (NEBDN)

References

External links
 BADN

1940 establishments in the United Kingdom
Dental organisations based in the United Kingdom
Dental nurses
Nursing organisations in the United Kingdom
Organisations based in Lancashire
Organizations established in 1940
Borough of Wyre